Cymbidium lowianum, called Low's boat orchid, is a species of orchid in the genus Cymbidium, native to Assam in India, Yunnan in China, Myanmar, Thailand, and Vietnam. It has gained the Royal Horticultural Society's Award of Garden Merit.

Subtaxa
The following varieties are currently accepted:
Cymbidium lowianum var. ailaoense X.M.Xu
Cymbidium lowianum var. kalawense (Colyear) Govaerts
Cymbidium lowianum var. lowianum

References

lowianum
Orchids of Assam
Orchids of Myanmar
Orchids of Thailand
Orchids of Vietnam
Orchids of Yunnan
Plants described in 1879